Seelmann is a surname. Notable people with the surname include:

 Georg Seelmann (1917–1989), German Luftwaffe ace
 Walter Seelmann-Eggebert (1915–1988), German radiochemist

See also
 Seelman
 Sehlman
 Sehlmann

German-language surnames